Rapti may refer to:

Rapti, Dang, a rural municipality in Dang district, Province no.5, Nepal
 Rapti Municipality, a municipality in Narayani zone of Nepal
 Rapti Zone, in Nepal, a first order administrative district west of Kathmandu
 West Rapti River, a river rising in Rapti Zone
 East Rapti River, a small river draining the Chitwan valley in Nepal